Altamura Island ( or de Altamura) is an island of México, in the Gulf of California. It is located in the bahía de Santa María, on the west coast of the state of Sinaloa, southwest of Saliaca Island, separated by an area of shallow water. It is one of the largest private islands in the world.

It is a barrier island with open beaches and large sand dunes. In the southern part there are intertidal zones made of silt, clay, sand and gravel; in the remaining part of the island there is coastline, as well as large dunes of sand in the northwestern part.

It is part of the bahía de Santa María complex, and there is a great variety of marine life, migratory birds and even whales.

References

External links 
 Private Islands
 "Angostura"
 Isla Altamura, un viaje a la naturaleza y vida silvestre
 Isla Altamura, un paraíso dentro de la Bahía Santa María

Bibliography 
 

Islands of Sinaloa
Islands of the Gulf of California
Uninhabited islands of Mexico